Renée M. Wachter (born November 16, 1966) is the tenth chancellor of the University of Wisconsin–Superior. Prior to her arrival at UW-Superior in 2011, she served as the founding Dean of the School of Business at Truman State University and member of the Council of Public Liberal Arts Colleges.

Early life and education
Wachter was born on November 16, 1966. She graduated from the University of Kansas with a Bachelor of Science degree in Business and completed her PhD from Indiana University.

Career
Upon completing her PhD, Wachter joined the faculty at the University of Indianapolis and taught management and information technology classes at Ball State University. During her tenure at these institutions, she was named an Associate Dean of their School of Business and Director of Graduate Business Programs. In 2003, after fielding numerous deanship offers, Wachter accepted a leadership position at Montana State University. She remained in Montana for three years before being appointed dean of the Business and Accountancy Division at Truman State University.

As a result of her accomplishments, Wachter was shortlisted for the position of the next Chancellor of the University of Wisconsin–Superior. She eventually accepted the position for the 2011–12 academic year.

References

Living people
1966 births
University of Kansas alumni
Indiana University alumni
Montana State University faculty
Truman State University faculty
Ball State University faculty
University of Indianapolis faculty
University of Wisconsin–Superior